Juan Alberto Andrada (born 4 January 1995) is an Argentine footballer who plays for Godoy Cruz Antonio Tomba as a midfielder.

References

External links

1995 births
Living people
Association football midfielders
Argentine footballers
Godoy Cruz Antonio Tomba footballers
Arsenal de Sarandí footballers
Club Atlético Banfield footballers
Argentine Primera División players
People from San Luis, Argentina